is a fictional character in the manga series One Piece by Eiichiro Oda. He is the fifth member to join and the doctor of the Straw Hat Pirates. Chopper is frequently featured on official merchandise, serving as a mascot for the series.

The power of the Zoan-type  provides him with the ability to transform into a full-sized reindeer or a reindeer-human hybrid. A self-developed drug he calls  enables him to perform even more transformations for a short time.

Rejected by his herd because of his blue nose and eating the Devil Fruit, Chopper is rescued by Drum Island's quack doctor Doctor Hiriluk. While developing a potion to create cherry blossoms when in contact with snow, Chopper is heartbroken when Hiriluk falls ill with a deadly disease. After Hiriluk's death, Doctor Kureha takes him in as his mentor. After the Straw Hats arrive at  Drum Island and take Chopper with them, Kureha uses Hiriluk's potion to turn the snowy sky into cherry blossoms, fulfilling Hiriluk's life mission. When complimented, Chopper acts flustered and sometimes yells at the person who complimented him to stop trying to make him happy. A running gag within the series is when other characters mistake him as a Tanuki, and he angrily corrects them, pointing out that he is a Tonakai (Japanese for "Reindeer").

Creation and conception

Design and characteristics
Tony Tony Chopper was created by manga artist Eiichiro Oda, the author of the manga series One Piece and made his first appearance in its 134th chapter, titled "Dr. Kureha", which was first published in Shueisha's Weekly Shōnen Jump magazine on May 8, 2000. In the original concept art for the Straw Hats, Chopper's default form was a bipedal reindeer with a note that he was a doctor but "an idiot otherwise." Chopper's default form would later be reworked to be smaller and cuter. When creating Chopper, Oda wanted a mascot who is both cute and very weak but also fearless.

With Chopper's back story, Oda wanted to illustrate that one need not be blood-related to be considered family.

According to Oda, Chopper is 17 years old (originally 15) and his birthday is December 24. When asked by a fan what the nationalities of the members of the Straw Hat Pirates would be if One Piece was set in the real world, Oda replied that Chopper would be Canadian.

Chopper is initially labeled a monster, leading to him to being ostracized. Chopper is very naïve, and has a tendency to believe anything told to him, even the outrageously fictitious, exaggerated lies of Usopp. Chopper loves to be complimented and is incapable of hiding his feelings. After the time-skip he embraces his status because he wants to be a “monster for Luffy."

Abilities
The power of the Zoan-type  provides Tony Tony Chopper with the ability to transform into three forms: a human, human-reindeer hybrid or his default reindeer form. Although the primary effects of the rumble ball only last three minutes, Chopper cannot consume a second ball for six hours without adverse effects, mainly the loss of control over his transformations during the three minutes of his second Rumble Ball. If Chopper consumes three Rumble Balls within six hours, he grows to monstrous proportions and loses all self control. This form, known as Monster Point, is extremely powerful, but also has the adverse effect of draining Chopper's life force. After the two-year timeskip Chopper is able to transform into six forms without a rumble ball and can use a rumble ball to control his Monster Point. Later with the help of their enemy and temporary prisoner Caesar Clown, Chopper was able to improve the formula and lengthen the effects of the Rumble Ball ten-fold to thirty minutes at a time.

Since Chopper is an animal who ate the Human-Human Fruit, he can converse with other animals and humans alike.

Voice actress

In the original Japanese anime of One Piece, Tony Tony Chopper's main voice actress is Ikue Ōtani. Kazue Ikura voiced Tony Tony Chopper for episodes 254–263. Brina Palencia voices Chopper in the English Funimation dub. Lisa Ortiz voiced him in the 4Kids Entertainment English dub. Emlyn Morinelli voices Chopper in Singapore’s Odex dub.

Appearances

In One Piece  
Chopper grew up on the winter island Drum, where he was an outcast among reindeer due to his blue nose. He ate the Hito Hito no Mi (ヒトヒトの実, Human Human Fruit), giving him the ability to speak, think, and transform into a human. This ability further alienated him from the other reindeer, and he was rejected by the herd. He grew up an outcast until taken in by the fake doctor Hiriluk, a former thief, who accepts Chopper as his son to instills within him his initial passion for medicine. After Hiriluk’s death, Chopper becomes Dr. Kureha’s assistant and learns her medical knowledge.

Luffy tries "to convince Chopper to join the crew as the ships Doctor. A frightened Chopper continues to give Luffy the slip and later explains he can’t be part of the crew because he is a monster. Luffy tells Chopper to shut up and come with them regardless, which moves Chopper to tears as he has finally found real friends, people who aren’t afraid of him."

Chopper is the doctor of the crew and has outstanding knowledge of medicine and medical drugs, as well as the preparation of remedies and ointments from regular fruits, roots and vegetables found on most islands. Most of this he learned during his apprenticeship under Dr. Kureha or from his time at the Birdie Kingdom.

In other media
Chopper has appeared in other media besides the manga and it's television anime adaptation. He is featured in most of the One Piece films starting with Movie 3: Chopper's Kingdom of Strange Animal Island, where he is the main character. He is also the main character in the ninth movie, which is a retelling of the storyline during which he was introduced.

Chopper has appeared in many One Piece licensed electronic video games. Though in the game, One Piece: Grand Battle he is not labeled  as a Straw Hat character, and has no alliance in the game. Though like the rest of the Straw Hat's, he has unlockable costumes outside of his alternate colors. In One Piece: Grand Adventure he is aligned with the Straw Hats. He is also a support character in Jump Super Stars. In 2006, he is featured in the Dragon Ball/One Piece/Naruto crossover game Battle Stadium D.O.N. as a playable character.

Chopper was seen in Bokusatsu Tenshi Dokuro-chan when Sakura mentions "reindeer who are doctors" and other things from anime, while he was freaking out in a forest. He also appears twice in the Webcomic VG Cats. Chopper and other characters also appeared in Cross Epoch, the crossover with Dragonball Z.

In merchandise
There have been various pieces of merchandise released for Chopper over the years. Various plush figures have been based on him, including many season based ones, as well as an assortment of others. There have also been many figures released of Chopper. Additionally, there have been many other pieces of merchandise based on Chopper such as cushions, clothing, towels, key chains, and clocks.

Reception

Critical reception
Sean Cubillas of Screen Rant ranked Chopper third on a top ten the most adorable anthropomorphic anime animals, writing, “It makes sense that the best-selling manga of all time would also have one of the cutest, talking animal characters of all time. Though berated by humans as a monster and even as an outcast by other reindeer, Tony Tony Chopper hasn't become anything less than a friendly, welcome face for all the fans. It also helps that there's just a lot of One Piece merch centered around him.” In a review, Cubillas writes "Tony Tony Chopper on design alone is already plenty iconic. He's meant to be the mascot for the series and after seeing all of the One Piece merch with his face on it, he's done a pretty good job. The scene to define him, however, comes in his backstory. After tragically losing Dr. Hiluluk to a political assassination, his own poison mushroom soup, and an undisclosed terminal illness, Chopper runs to Dr. Kureha's office waving Hiluluk's pirate flag. He begs the old woman to teach him, proclaiming that he wants to be a doctor that can cure any disease."

In another article, Cubillas uniquely gave Chopper two entries in his ranking of the series top ten running gags, noting  "Part of the Cowardly Trio, Chopper is as up for a fight as Usopp with an actual illness. Unfortunately for him, he can't quite hide away … it's easy to understand why most characters who see him for the first time tend to think that he's a tanuki (or a raccoon dog). While Chopper has some kinship with other animals, he certainly doesn't like being mislabeled, particularly when this denotes him as the Straw Hat's pet and not as the talented doctor that he truly is."

An IGN review of the manga praised Chopper's character as one of the best in the series and said that he was able to be both touching and funny.

However, Chopper's status as a mascot met with criticism by both fans and critics, who view him as too stereotypical and insufficiently developed compared to the other Straw Hats. Dyler Crews wrote, "Even before Pikachu solidified the concept of a manga and anime franchise having an adorable mascot in the '90s, the trope was already old hat. Looking to cash in on merchandising, Oda simplified Tony Tony Chopper's design to make the character resemble a plush toy. Although Oda didn't relegate Chopper to mascot status only, giving the character an essential job within the crew, Chopper's utility in the story has diminished as his marketability grew. Having the voice actor behind Pikachu didn't help either.

Popularity
Chopper ranked in the top ten during the second through seventh popularity polls. Chopper was the fourth most popular character in the second, third, and fourth Japanese popularity polls. He was ranked the seventh most popular character in the fifth and sixth Japanese popularity poll. In the first worldwide popularity poll, Chopper was ranked the sixteenth most-favorite character.

The denouement of Chopper’s introduction arc was rated the ninth most heartbreaking scene in One Piece, and Chopper was involved in half of the top ten most heartbreaking scenes in the manga: the Going Merry’s funeral, Robin saying she wants to live, the Straw Hats’ departure, the Going Merry rescuing the Straw Hats, and the aforementioned denouement, when Kureha fulfills Hiriluk's dying wish by making Drum “bloom” like a Sakura tree. Jamie Lee Curtis said Chopper was her favorite character and that she would like to play Kureha in the Netflix adaptation.

Further reading

References

External links
Official Chopperman Website (Japanese)
One Piece Movie 3 Official Site (Japanese)
One Piece Movie 9 Official Site (Japanese)

One Piece characters
Anime and manga characters with superhuman strength
Comics characters introduced in 2000
Fictional deer and moose
Fictional pharmacists
Fictional physicians
Fictional pirates
Fictional sea pirates
Male characters in anime and manga
Shapeshifter characters in comics
Teenage characters in anime and manga
Anthropomorphic animal characters